American singer Usher has embarked on six concert tours, four of which have been worldwide. He first served as an opening act for Mary J. Blige, Janet Jackson, and Puff Daddy from 1997 to 1999. His headlining arena tour debut, 8701 Evolution Tour began in North America then expanded to Europe and visiting Africa, supporting his third studio album, 8701 (2001). Following the release of his fourth studio album, Confessions, Usher embarked on his next world tour The Truth Tour. For this tour Usher collaborated with MasterCard, the company gave him his own prepaid debit card with his picture on it that was sold at his concert. The card gave his fans access to his website where you get discounts on concert tickets and Usher merchandise, T-shirts and key chains. In 2008, to promote his fifth studio album, Here I Stand, he began his 14 date One Night Stand Tour in the United States.

In 2012, Usher announced that he would embark on his fourth concert tour, the Euphoria Tour, to further promote Looking 4 Myself, he planned to perform in countries including France, Germany, Belgium, Norway, Finland, Sweden, Switzerland and the United Kingdom, however it was cancelled because of his commitment to the reality talent show The Voice, where he was a judge in the show's fourth season. In 2010 he took part in his third world tour; The OMG Tour, in which supported his sixth studio album, Raymond v. Raymond (2010), as well as his first extended play, Versus (2010). Grossing in the US$75 million, selling over 922,000 tickets. In 2014, Usher went on his fourth concert world tour, The UR Experience. This tour was composed of a wide array of Raymonds's discography, in addition to new songs "Good Kisser", "She Came to Give It to You", "I Don't Mind" and a medleys of previous hits.

Outside of world tours, Usher has performed an array of televised tribute performances for various artist some including Michael Jackson, Luther Vandross, Frank Sinatra, Quincy Jones, LA Reid, Janet Jackson, Whitney Houston, and Stevie Wonder. Raymond performed at Super Bowl XLV halftime show, Saturday Night Live, various times at awards shows such as the Grammy Awards, MTV Video Music Awards, BET Awards, American Music Awards and others as well. He has performed at events for both the first inauguration and second inauguration for President Barack Obama. Performing at the We Are One: The Obama Inaugural Celebration at the Lincoln Memorial on January 18, 2008, and "Kids' Inaugural: Our Children Our Future" event at the Washington Convention Center in Washington, D.C. on January 19, 2013.

Tours

Concerts and Festivals

Guest act

Tribute performances

Award shows

Performances at television shows and specials

References

 
Lists of concert tours